Parrotiopsis jacquemontiana is a species of deciduous shrub or small tree in the witch hazel family, native to the western Himalayas, particularly Kashmir, Murree, Hazara, the Swat District, and Kurram, at altitudes from 1200 to 2800 meters. Its wood is strong and often used for handles, walking sticks, etc. Twigs are used for baskets and rope.

References

External links

 J. Arnold Arbor. 1: 256 256 1920.
 Hooker, J. D. 1896. Parrotia jacquemontiana, Curtis Botanical Magazine 122: plate 7501.
 Arnold Arboretum description
 The Plant List entry
 International Plant Names Index (IPNI) entry
 Efloras entry
 Plants for a Future entry

jacquemontiana
Taxa named by Joseph Decaisne